Ambergris Museum is a Mesoamerican archaeology museum in Belize. It houses ancient Mayan civilization artifacts.

The Ambergris Museum opened in February 1998 in San Pedro Town, Belize. It covers the history of Ambergris Caye from early Mayan culture onwards.

References

External links
Official website

Mesoamerican art museums
Museums in Belize
Museums established in 1998
Archaeology of Belize
1998 establishments in Belize